Omar Al-akel (born April 11, 1980) is a Syrian footballer for Al-Wahda.

References 

Living people
1980 births
Syrian footballers
Sportspeople from Damascus

Association football midfielders
Syrian Premier League players